Worsley and Westwood Park (ward) is an electoral ward of Salford, England.  It is represented in Westminster by Barbara Keeley MP for Worsley and Eccles South. A profile of the ward conducted by Salford City Council in 2014 recorded a population of 10,090. Formerly named Worsley, following extensive boundary changes to wards across the City of Salford, the ward was expanded to include Westwood Park, and the ward was renamed Worsley and Westwood Park. These new boundaries were first contested on 6 May 2021 in all-out elections, requiring all three ward councillors to stand for re-election.

Councillors 
The ward is represented by three councillors; Adam Kealey (Con), Robin Garrido (Con), and Karen Garrido (Con)

 indicates seat up for re-election.

Elections in 2020s

May 2022

May 2021 

Boundary changes in wards across the City of Salford meant that all three councillors in each ward were required to stand for re-election in the May 2020 poll, although this was postponed for one year due to the Covid-19 pandemic.

Elections in 2010s

May 2019

May 2018

May 2016

May 2015

May 2014

May 2012

May 2011

May 2010

Elections in 2000s

References 

Salford City Council Wards